The 2017 Moldovan "B" Division was the 27th season of Moldovan football's third-tier league. A total of 30 teams competed in this division. The season began on 29 July 2017 and ended on 25 November 2017.

The league consisted of three regional groups, Nord (North), Centru (Centre) and Sud (South).

North

Results 
The schedule consists of two rounds, each team plays each other once home-and-away for a total of 18 matches per team.

Centre

Results 
The schedule consists of two rounds, each team plays each other once home-and-away for a total of 18 matches per team.

South

Results 
The schedule consists of two rounds, each team plays each other once home-and-away for a total of 16 matches per team.

References

External links
 Divizia B - Results, fixtures, tables and news - Soccerway

Moldovan Liga 2 seasons
3
Moldova 3